Swanwick Hall School is a mixed secondary school and sixth form located in Swanwick, Alfreton, Derbyshire, England. In 2004 Ofsted noted that the school had strong university links and had Training School status.

History

Grammar school
It was known as the coeducational Swanwick Hall Grammar School from 1922.

Comprehensive
The school became comprehensive in 1973. Previously a community school administered by Derbyshire County Council, Swanwick Hall School was converted to academy status in April 2016. The school is now part of the Two Counties Trust which includes Ashfield School and Selston High School. However, Swanwick Hall School continues to coordinate with Derbyshire County Council for admissions.

Notable pupils

Swanwick Hall Grammar School
 Robert J. Elliott, mathematician
 Roger Elliott FRS, Wykeham Professor of Physics from 1974 to 1988 at the University of Oxford, and Chief Executive from 1988 to 1993 of Oxford University Press (OUP), cousin of Robert, and known for his Elliott formula
 Edwin Jowitt, former High Court judge

See also
Listed buildings in Swanwick, Derbyshire

References

External links 
 Swanwick Hall School official website

Academies in Derbyshire
Amber Valley
Secondary schools in Derbyshire